Carlos Lorenzo Mañueco (born 25 February 1942) is a Mexican sprinter. He competed in the men's 100 metres at the 1964 Summer Olympics.

References

1942 births
Living people
Athletes (track and field) at the 1964 Summer Olympics
Mexican male sprinters
Olympic athletes of Mexico
Place of birth missing (living people)
20th-century Mexican people